The 2003 FIBA Americas Championship for Women (also known as 2003 Panamerican Olympic Qualifying Tournament for Women) was the qualifying tournament for FIBA Americas at the women's basketball tournament at the 2004 Summer Olympics in Athens, Greece. The tournament was held in Culiacan, Mexico from 17 – 21 September 2003. Seven national teams entered the event under the auspices of FIBA Americas, the sport's regional governing body. The city of Culiacan hosted the tournament. Brazil won their third title after defeating Cuba in the final.

Squads

Preliminary round

Group A

|}

Group B

|}

Semifinal

Final Round

Fifth Place

Third place game

Final

Final standings

External links
2003 Panamerican Olympic Qualifying Tournament for Women, FIBA.com.

FIBA Women's AmeriCup
2003 in women's basketball
2003 in Mexican sports
International women's basketball competitions hosted by Mexico
2003–04 in North American basketball
2003–04 in South American basketball